HMS Minotaur was the lead ship of the  armoured frigates built for the Royal Navy during the 1860s. They were the longest single-screw warships ever built. Minotaur took nearly four years between her launching and commissioning because she was used for evaluations of her armament and different sailing rigs.

The ship spent the bulk of her active career as flagship of the Channel Squadron, including during Queen Victoria's Golden Jubilee Fleet Review in 1887. She became a training ship in 1893 and was then hulked in 1905 when she became part of the training school at Harwich. Minotaur was renamed several times before being sold for scrap in 1922 and broken up the following year.

Design and description
The Minotaur-class armoured frigates were essentially enlarged versions of the ironclad  with heavier armament, armour, and more powerful engines. They retained the broadside ironclad layout of their predecessor, but their sides were fully armoured to protect the 50 guns they were designed to carry.  Each was equipped with a plough-shaped ram that was also more prominent than that of Achilles.

The ships displaced . The hull was subdivided by 15 watertight transverse bulkheads and had a double bottom underneath the engine and boiler rooms.

Minotaur was considered "an excellent sea-boat and a steady gun platform, but unhandy under steam and practically unmanageable under sail" as built. Steam-powered steering improved her manoeuvring qualities significantly when it was installed in 1875 and she was judged "one of our very best manoeuvrers we have in the Navy" by Vice Admiral Philip Colomb in 1890.

Propulsion
Minotaur had a two-cylinder trunk steam engine, made by John Penn and Sons, that drove a single  propeller.

Because her propeller could only be disconnected and not hoisted up into the stern of the ship to reduce drag, Minotaur only made  under sail. Both funnels were semi-retractable to reduce wind resistance while under sail. Admiral George A. Ballard described Minotaur and her sisters as "the dullest performers under canvas of the whole masted fleet of their day, and no ships ever carried so much dress to so little purpose." In 1893–4, after her withdrawal from active service, Minotaur had two masts removed and was re-rigged as a barque.

Armament

The armament of the Minotaur-class ships was intended to be 40 rifled 110-pounder breech-loading guns on the main deck and 10 more on the upper deck on pivot mounts. The gun was a new design from Armstrong, but proved a failure a few years after its introduction. The gun was withdrawn before any were received by any of the Minotaur-class ships. All four nine-inch and 20 seven-inch guns were mounted on the main deck while four seven-inch guns were fitted on the upper deck as chase guns. The ship also received eight brass howitzers for use as saluting guns.

It was credited with the ability to penetrate  armour.

Minotaur was rearmed in 1875 with a uniform armament of 17 nine-inch guns, 14 on the main deck, two forward chase guns and one rear chase gun. The gun ports had to be enlarged to accommodate the larger guns by hand, at a cost of £250 each. About 1883 two  breech-loading guns replaced two 9-inch muzzle-loading guns. Four quick-firing (QF) 4.7-inch (120-mm) guns, eight QF 3-pounder Hotchkiss guns, eight machine guns and two torpedo tubes were installed in 1891–2.

Armour

A single 5.5-inch transverse bulkhead protected the forward chase guns on the upper deck.

Construction and service
HMS Minotaur was originally ordered on 2 September 1861 as HMS Elephant, in honour of the ship once commanded by Nelson seventy years before, but her name was changed to Minotaur during construction. She was laid down on 12 September 1861 by the Thames Ironworks in Blackwall, London. She was launched on 12 December 1863, commissioned in April 1867 and completed on 1 June 1867. The lengthy delay in completion was due to frequent changes in design details, and experiments with her armament and with her sailing rig. The ship cost a total of £478,855.

Minotaur finally commissioned in Portsmouth as the flagship of the Channel Squadron, a position which she retained until 1873. In 1872 the ship nearly rammed the ironclad  as they were leaving Belfast Lough. Minotaur lost her bowsprit and fore topgallant mast, but Bellerophon only suffered some minor flooding. She paid off for a long refit in 1873 and resumed her position in 1875 when she rejoined the Channel Squadron. Minotaur became the first ship in the Royal Navy to receive a permanent installation of an electric searchlight in 1876.

On 28 February 1887, she rescued the passengers and crew of the Brithsh steamship , which was wrecked on a reef off Vigo, Spain. The ship was the flagship of Vice Admiral Sir William Hewett, who had earned the Victoria Cross in the siege of Sevastopol in 1854, during Queen Victoria's Golden Jubilee Fleet Review on 23 July 1887. Minotaur was paid off at the end of 1887 in Portsmouth and assigned to the Reserve until 1893 when she became a training ship at Portland. She was renamed HMS Boscawen II in March 1904 and transferred in 1905 to Harwich as part of the  training school . The ship was renamed 11 June 1906 as HMS Ganges and then to Ganges II on 25 April 1908. She was sold on 30 January 1922 for scrap.

Notes

Footnotes

References

External links

A photo of HMS Minotaur and HMS Valiant in dock c. 1870
A National Maritime Museum engraving of HMS Minotaur c. 1863
Lower deck plan of HMS Minotaur, c. 1890

 

Minotaur-class ironclads
Ships built in Leamouth
1863 ships
Victorian-era battleships of the United Kingdom
Maritime incidents in December 1886